Smaranda Gheorghiu (5 October 1857 – 26 January 1944) was a Romanian poet, novelist, essayist, playwright, educator, feminist and traveler. She wrote under a number of pseudonyms and is perhaps best known under the moniker Maica Smara (Mother Smara), which was given to her by Veronica Micle.

An early Romanian feminist, she wrote both fiction and non-fiction works with a feminist slant in which she argued against the prevailing views of the time, which held women to be intellectually inferior to men. Smara traveled extensively and recorded her experiences in several volume of travel literature. For her work as a teacher and her efforts to reform the education system, she is sometimes given the sobriquet ”Educator of the People”.

Biography 
She was born on 5 October 1857 in the Wallachian city of Târgoviște in a noble family. The daughter of Niţă Andronescu and Alexandrina Vlădescu, she was the oldest of ten children. Niță was a wealthy landowner and one time prefect of the county, while Alexandrina, also of noble stock. was a woman who thoroughly enjoyed traveling and delighting her close ones with stories of European museums. Although the precise relation is disputed, Smaranda was a relative of poet and fabulist Grigore Alexandrescu.

After elementary studies in her hometown, in 1870 she went to high-school in Bucharest, graduating from the Central School for Girls. Soon after finishing high-school she married George Gârbea, a teacher, against her family's wishes. Gârbea encouraged her literary interests and introduced her to some of the cultural paragons of the age, such as Ion Luca Caragiale, George Coşbuc and Alexandru Vlahuţă. It was during this time that she first started publishing poetry.

Her marriage to Gârbea was rocky and after becoming estranged several times, she finally leaves him for good in the early 1880s, when she receives a teaching position in the town of Sinaia. In 1883 she meets Petre Gheorghiu, an army captain and moves with him to  Ploiești, where she continues to teach and start contributing to the Şcoala Română magazine. She later moves to Bucharest, where she will continue teaching until the end of her life. By the mid-1880s she was already established in the Bucharest literary scene, with Smaranda hosting some of the most popular gatherings of the cultural elite. Around this time she meets Mihai Eminescu and Veronica Micle, who will soon become her friends and give her the nickname Maica Smara, a reference to both motherhood and monasticism.

Her second husband, Petre Gheorghiu died a few years after their marriage, which left Smaranda a widow with two daughters: Zoe and Magadalena, one from each marriage.

Literary career 

Her literary debut came in 1881, when she began publishing poetry in Alexandru Macedonski's Literatorul magazine. Much of her early output consisted of pedagogical writings and children's literature. She also starts to publish more serious poetry and essays in literary magazines and periodicals such as Convorbiri literare, Fântâna Blanduziei, Adevărul, Revista literară, Generația viitoare, Românul, Tribuna and Universul.

In 1888 she publishes her first book, a volume of poetry called Din pana suferinței (Suffering's Pen). Her next volume is one of short stories, Novele (1890). In 1892, shortly after the death of her friend, Veronica Micle, she wrote a monograph of Micle, in which she outline her contributions to the Romantic poetry of Romania. A talk on Micle's legacy held at the Romanian Athenaeum on 13 December 1891 also gives her the distinction of being the first woman to hold a lecture in this prestigious institution.

In 1893, Smaranda Gheorghiu issued her very own literary journal, Altițe și Bibiliuri (Lace and Frills), through which she called for a reform of the education system, which she saw as outdated. Throughout the 1890s her works become more politically charged. In 1896 she holds two lectures on feminism, among the first of their kind in Romania. These are Feciorii și fiicele noastre (Our Sons and Daughters) and Inteligența femeii (Women's Intelligence), both later published as volumes. Around the turn of the century, Maica Smara begins publishing travel literature, based on her tours of Europe. Between 1904 and 1906 she publishes several plays covering subjects as diverse as incest, legal male responsibility for fathered children, the Union of the Romanian principalities, or working class life. Her first novel, Fata tatii, (Daddy's Girl) was published in 1912 and deals with feminist issues.

She continues to write until towards the end of her life, with the last work published during her lifetime being Cântă Dorna (Dorna is Singing), an epic poem in two acts that appeared in 1939.

Despite her multifaceted literary output, her most recognizable work today probably consists of the lyrics “Vine vine primăvara / Se așterne-n toată țara / Floricele pe câmpii / Hai să le-adunăm copii” that make up the so-called ”Cântecul școlarului”, a well known children's song about the arrival of spring.

Activism and travels 

Particularly after the death of her second husband, Smaranda traveled extensively in Romania, Italy, Belgium, France, Norway, Denmark, Sweden, Finland, Greece etc., often lecturing on education and women's emancipation. She described many of these excursions in a series of travel writings.

As her fame grew, she was invited to represent Romania in several international conferences, such as the 8th International Congress of Orientalists (Stockholm and Christiania, 1889), the 9th Universal Peace Congress (Paris, 1900) and the Latin Congress (Paris, 1902). In 1900 she is elected vice-president of the Universal Union of Women's Congress for Peace. She was also a strong supporter of outdoor education, and in 1936 took part in the Second International Congress for Open Air Education, which took place in Belgium.

Some sources incorrectly claim that Smaranda Gheorghiu was the first woman in the world to reach the North Pole. Considering that the first verified attainment of the North Pole by a human was not until 1926, this claim is obviously false and most likely appeared as a misunderstanding of the title of her 1932 volume O româncă spre Polul Nord (A Romanian Woman towards the North Pole), which details her 1902 travels through Denmark, Sweden, Norway and Finland. According to this travel memoir, she did manage to reach North Cape, one of the northernmost points of Europe, an impressive feat for that time, but more than 2000 kilometers shy of the North Pole.

Legacy 
Maica Smara died on 26 January 1944 in Bucharest and was buried in the Bellu Cemetery, receiving homages from many of the cultural and political personalities of the time.

A bust depicting her was unveiled in Mitropoliei Park, Târgoviște in 1957. A second bust can be seen in Cișmigiu Gardens, in central Bucharest, where she is described as ”Educatoare a poporului” (Educator of the Romanian People).

The secondary school ”Smaranda Gheorghiu” in Târgoviște was named in her honour in 1997.

Bibliography

Poetry 

 Din pana suferinței, 1888 (Suffering's Pen)
 Corbul cu pene de aur, 1897 (The Raven with Golden Feathers)
 Mozaicuri, 1897 (Inlays)
 Calvar, 1901 (Calvary)
 Țara mea, 1905 (My Country)
 Cântă Dorna, 1939 (Dorna is Singing)

Short stories 

 Novele, 1890 (Novellas)
 Dumitrițe brumate, 1932 (Hoarfrosted Marigolds)

Novels 

 Fata tatii, 1912 (Daddy's Girl)
 Băiatul mamei, 1917 (Mom's Boy)
 Domnul Bădină, 1931 (Mr. Bădină)

Theater plays 

 Mirza, 1904
 Ispășire, 1905 (Expiation)
 La 24 ianuarie, 1905 (On January 24)
 Dorul de țară, 1905 (Homesickness)
 Meseriașii, 1905 (The Craftsmen) 
 Stâlpi de pază, 1906 (The Guarding Pillars)

Travel literature 

 Schițe din Târgoviște, 1898 (Sketches from Târgoviște)
 Schițe si amintiri din Italia, 1900 (Sketches and Memories from Italy) 
 De la București la Capul Nord, 1905 (From Bucharest to Cape North)
 Schite si amintiri din Cehoslovacia, 1925 (Sketches and Memories from Czechoslovakia) 
 O româncă spre Polul Nord, 1932 (A Romanian Woman towards the North Pole)

Non-fiction 

 Veronica Micle. Viața și operile sale, 1892 (Veronica Micle. Her Life and Works)
 Feciorii și fiicele noastre, 1896 (Our Sons and Daughters)
 Inteligența femeii, 1896 (Women's Intelligence)

References 

Romanian poets
Romanian novelists
Romanian essayists
Romanian dramatists and playwrights
Romanian educators
Romanian feminists
Romanian travel writers
1857 births
1944 deaths
People from Târgoviște
19th-century Romanian women writers